Doljani is populated place in   Jablanica Municipality, Bosnia and Hercegovina, between Jablanica and Mostar.  This  village lies along the Doljanka river (which was named after it)
Doljani are located in the northern Herzegovina, in the northeastern part of the Nature Park "Blidinje". Elevation ranges from 600 to 750 meters in the place. The highest peaks that surround the village are  Baćin (1,282 m), Borovinka (1430 m), and Vitlenica (1655 m) Throughout the Doljani valley flowing the river Doljanka.

History

Demography

According to the 2013 census, its population was 483.

See also
Jablanica
Doljanka

References

Populated places in Jablanica, Bosnia and Herzegovina
Villages in Bosnia and Herzegovina